Jamie Alcroft (born January 18, 1949) is an American comedian and voice actor known for his voice-over work in movies, TV shows and video games and was half of the comedy duo Mack & Jamie.

Biography

Early life and education
Alcroft is of English, Welsh, Irish and German ancestry. He earned a Bachelor of Science in Communication from Ohio University in 1971.

Career
Alcroft was working as a disc jockey at a Key West radio station in 1979 when cartoonist Mack Dryden left a note for him at his studio. It read "You must be one of the funniest men in Key West; I'm the other one." The pair got to know one another and began performing as a stand-up act in Key West.

They had been working together for less than two years when they were invited to appear on The Tonight Show Starring Johnny Carson. That and other TV appearances led to their own syndicated show in 1985, called Comedy Break. They taped 125 half-hour shows in less than a year.
Their appearance on The Tonight Show with Jay Leno, prompted Leno to call them,"The funniest Duo working today." Mack and Jamie continue to perform at Corporate Events around the world and have earned the reputation as Clean Comedians.

As a voice actor, Alcroft has provided numerous voices for animated series, commercials and video games such as Return to Castle Wolfenstein, Gears of War I, II, III and IV and Call of Duty: United Offensive as Lieutenant Lehmkuhl and Sgt. Ramirez. He voiced Wheeljack in the video game adaptation of Transformers: Dark Of The Moon, several voices in Ninja Gaiden 2 and Adam Sandler's Eight Crazy Nights. He also played the voice as the interviewer from the intro and epilogue of Spyro the Dragon and other numerous dragons. Alcroft also voiced Dr. Dean in Scooby-Doo! and the Witch's Ghost.

He was named 2009 Westlake Village Citizen of the Year and has been voted one of the "25 Most Influential People" in Ventura County. He has dedicated his life to raising funds for schools and charities, through local businesses partners.

He has teamed up with Phil Proctor of Firesign Theatre fame to write and perform "Boomers on a Bench" which can be seen on YouTube and Facebook weekly.

Marriage and children
Alcroft is married to two-time Emmy award winning figure skating choreographer Sarah Kawahara. The couple have three children: Alysse, Hayley and Thatcher.

Personal life
In 2017, Alcroft had a heart transplant.

Filmography

Film

Television

Video games

References

External links

Mack & Jamie

1949 births
Living people
American businesspeople
American male video game actors
American male voice actors
American people of English descent
American people of German descent
American people of Irish descent
American people of Welsh descent
American radio DJs
American stand-up comedians
Place of birth missing (living people)
Ohio University alumni